Aligav (also Romanized as ‘Alīgāv; also known as ‘Alīgū and Alkū) is a village in Abbas-e Gharbi Rural District, Tekmeh Dash District, Bostanabad County, East Azerbaijan Province, Iran. At the 2006 census, its population was 115, in 26 families.

References 

Populated places in Bostanabad County